"I Want Your Soul" is a single by Armand Van Helden and the third from his seventh studio album, Ghettoblaster. It contains a sample of "Do You Want It Right Now" by Siedah Garrett.

Track listing
Australian CD single
"I Want Your Soul" (radio edit) – 3:15
"I Want Your Soul" (original) – 6:39
"I Want Your Soul" (TV Rock Remix) – 6:41
"I Want Your Soul" (Crookers Remix) – 5:01
"I Want Your Soul" (Hipp-E's Bonus Remix) – 1:22
"I Want Your Soul" (Fake Blood Remix) – 5:28

Chart history
"I Want Your Soul" made its debut at number 44 on the ARIA Club Chart before spending 5 weeks at number 3 and then successfully peaking at number 1.

References

2007 singles
2007 songs
Armand Van Helden songs
Music videos directed by Vashtie Kola